Croker Island Airport  is located on the west side of Croker Island, in the Northern Territory, Australia.

Airlines and destinations

See also
List of airports in the Northern Territory

References

Airports in the Northern Territory